Ischioloncha is a genus of beetles in the family Cerambycidae.

It includes the following species:

 Ischioloncha columbiana Breuning, 1956
 Ischioloncha lanei (Prosen, 1957)
 Ischioloncha lineata Bates, 1885
 Ischioloncha rondonia Martins & Galileo, 2003
 Ischioloncha strandiella Breuning, 1942
 Ischioloncha wollastoni Thomson, 1861

References

Apomecynini
Cerambycidae genera